The Stichasteridae are a small family of Asteroidea (sea stars) in the order Forcipulatida. Genera were formerly unassigned, or in the family Asteriidae.

Genera
The World Register of Marine Species lists these genera within the family Stichasteridae:

 Allostichaster  Verrill, 1914
 Cosmasterias  Sladden, 1889
 Granaster  Perrier, 1894     
 Neomorphaster  Sladden, 1889
 Neosmilaster Fisher, 1930
 Pseudechinaster H.E.S. Clark, 1962 
 Smilasterias  Sladden, 1889 
 Stichaster  Muller & Troschel, 1840
 Stichastrella  Verrill, 1914

References

External links
 

 
Forcipulatida
Echinoderm families